Robert Hedges (born December 10, 1976), better known by his stage name Muja Messiah, is an American rapper from Minneapolis, Minnesota. He has been a member of the groups Raw Villa and Villa Rosa. Vibe named him in "51 Best MySpace Rappers" and URB named him in "Next 1000." City Pages also named him the best Minneapolis hip hop artist of 2009.

Career
In 2008, Muja Messiah released a mixtape, Mpls Massacre Vol. 1, and then released his debut album Thee Adventures of a B-Boy D-Boy the same year.

Two years later in 2010, he released the album M-16's.

In 2014, he released God Kissed It the Devil Missed It. It was listed as one of the best Minnesota rap album of 2014 by City Pages.

The next year in 2015, he released the album Angel Blood Soup and the collaborative album 9th House with I Self Devine.

Discography

Studio albums
 Thee Adventures of a B-Boy D-Boy (2008)
 M-16's (2010)
 God Kissed It the Devil Missed It (2014)
 Angel Blood Soup (2015)
 9th House (2015) 
 Lucky Bastard (2019)
 Cooler Heads Prevail (2022)

Mixtapes
 MPLS Massace Vol. 1 (2008)

EPs
 Wutz Going Down? (2001)
 Saran Rap (2017)

References

External links
 
 

1976 births
Living people
American male rappers
American hip hop musicians
Midwest hip hop musicians
21st-century American rappers
21st-century American male musicians